The 2010 Toyota Grand Prix of Long Beach was the fourth round of the 2010 IndyCar Series season, and took place on April 18, 2010. The race was contested over 85 laps of the  street course in Long Beach, California, and was telecast by Versus in the United States. The race also marked the 25th consecutive year of Toyota's sponsorship of the Grand Prix of Long Beach, one of the longest-running active sponsorships of a motor race in North America.

Report

Background

Practice and qualifying

Race
The 27th edition of the Grand Prix of Long Beach got underway at 1:15 p.m. PDT. Points leader Will Power, starting on the pole for the third consecutive race led into the first turn.  Justin Wilson attempted to go down the inside of Ryan Hunter-Reay, the man who started alongside Power on the front row, but he eventually settled into third spot. Tony Kanaan moved into fourth having got around both Hélio Castroneves and Ryan Briscoe at the start. The rest of the field got by the first turn without incident, usually uncommon in Long Beach.  In the early laps of the race, Hunter-Reay stayed within a second of race leader Power, and Wilson kept a watching brief on the lead duo around 2 seconds behind Hunter-Reay. Fourth placed Kanaan was unable to keep up with the lead trio, but was able to keep Castroneves at arm's length.

This status quo was maintained till lap 17 when, coming off turn 11, race leader Power hit the pit lane speed limiter button by mistake. Both Hunter-Reay and Wilson took advantage of the error to go past, and Power got demoted to third by the time he had corrected it. On the next lap, Ryan Briscoe, who had spent most of the first stint holding off Scott Dixon, got around teammate Castroneves at turn 9 and left the latter to hold off the New Zealander.

The first round of pitstops took place between lap 25 and lap 30 and Hunter-Reay comfortably kept the lead ahead of Wilson and Power. Kanaan, in fourth, was now 15 seconds behind the leader, and fifth-placed Briscoe once again found himself harassed by Scott Dixon after the latter swapped places with Castroneves during the pit stops. Race leader Hunter-Reay began to catch lapped traffic at around the half-way mark, but maintained a lead of around 2–3 seconds over Wilson who in turn had Power 4–5 seconds behind him, the gaps fluctuating due to the traffic.

On lap 53, just a few corners after Hunter-Reay had got around Alex Lloyd to put him a lap down, Wilson also tried to get by him. However, he wasn't close enough and there was contact between the two, which left Wilson with a damaged front wing. He came in immediately and changed the entire nose assembly on his car, and filled his car up with fuel. However, the stop took 21 seconds and that meant that Power was able to make his second fuel stop and come out ahead of Wilson. Ryan Briscoe had a slow stop and dropped down to eighth behind Dixon, Castroneves and Mario Moraes.

The caution came out on lap 59 when Mario Romancini and Graham Rahal, both already a lap behind the leader, came together at turn 1 and ended up in the tyre barriers. This bunched the field up but importantly, Hunter-Reay had the two lapped cars of Raphael Matos and Takuma Sato between himself and second-placed Power. Thus, on the restart, Hunter-Reay had a clear run and pulled away from the field. Power struggled to get around Sato and Wilson took advantage of the situation to dive up the inside at turn 1 and take second. After his earlier incident with Lloyd, he was more cautious in dealing with the lapped cars, and by the time he had got around Matos, Hunter-Reay was over 5 seconds up the road.

Hunter-Reay managed the gap comfortably for the rest of the race and took his second career Indy Racing League win by 5.6 seconds from Wilson. Power had to make do with third ahead of Dixon and Kanaan. The top 10 was completed by Mario Moraes, Castroneves, Briscoe, Dan Wheldon and Mike Conway. Hunter-Reay's win moved him to third spot in the points standings, just 1 behind second-placed Castroneves. Points leader Power extended his lead to 42 points. Wilson moved to fourth in the points table, 4 points behind Hunter-Reay, while defending series champion Dario Franchitti dropped to sixth after his 12th-place finish.

Classification

Qualifying
 All cars were split into two groups of twelve, with the fastest six from each group going through to the "top 12" session. In this session, the fastest six cars progressed to the "Firestone Fast Six". The fastest driver in the final session claimed pole, with the rest of the cars lining up in session order, regardless of qualifying times (fast six from 1–6, top 12 from 7–12 and round 1 from 13–25, with group 1 drivers occupying the odd–numbered grid positions, and group 2 drivers occupying the even–numbered grid positions).

Race

Championship standings after the race
Drivers' Championship standings

 Note: Only the top five positions are included.

References

External links 

Toyota Grand Prix of Long Beach
Toyota Grand Prix of Long Beach
Toyota Grand Prix of Long Beach
Grand Prix of Long Beach